Dixie Inn is a village in Webster Parish, Louisiana, United States. The population was 352 at the 2000 census. It is located off Interstate 20 at the old Shreveport Road, some twenty-six miles east of Shreveport. Minden, the seat of Webster Parish, is located some three miles to the east. Dixie Inn is part of the Minden Micropolitan Statistical Area.

Most of the original houses in Dixie Inn were built during World War II to serve munitions workers at the former Louisiana Army Ammunition Plant located off U.S. Highway 80 to the east.

Dixie Inn was incorporated in 1956. Clyde A. Stanley (1910–1959) became the first mayor of the village; he defeated James Whit "Tinker" Volentine (1915–1982) by a vote of 69 to 54. All but seven of the registered voters participated in the election.

In January 2016, the Dixie Inn Village Council approved an ordinance, 109-A, which doubles speeding fines on residential streets. The move was initiated to stop motorists from using the back streets to avoid the traffic light at the intersection of Highways 80 and 371. Violations will henceforth cost $150, with a $2 increment for each mile over the limit.

As of January 1, 2017, Dixie Inn has an all-female village government consisting of Mayor Kay Hallmark-Stratton (No Party), elected by a one-vote margin over her female predecessor, and three Republican aldermen, Donna Suman Hoffoss, Nell Finley, and Judy McKenzie.

Historic Antioch Baptist Church

The Antioch Baptist Church in Dixie Inn was first established in September 1858 as the Gum Spring Church, named for a natural spring near the site of what became in the next century the Louisiana Army Ammunition Plant. The church moved eastward to the existing site effective February 25, 1872, with the Reverend John Dupree as the first part-time pastor. Antioch observed a centennial ceremony on that same day in 1972. In 1882, fire destroyed the building and all church records. The structure was rebuilt and new rooms were added over the years. In 1943, the church called J. R. Hearron as its first full-time pastor.

In 1957, Antioch opened a new brick-veneer sanctuary, the planning of which had been undertaken during the tenure of pastor Millard Robert Perkins, Sr. (1918–1979), a native of Glenmora in Rapides Parish. However, the construction was not completed until the summer of 1957, by which time Thomas E. Windsor had become the pastor. On October 20, 1957, a few months after the construction of the new sanctuary, all of the church buildings except the pastor's residence were razed by fire. Reconstruction soon began and was completed in October 1959. Since Hearron, the full-time Antioch pastors have included Cecil Basham, J. Guy Allen, Millard Perkins, Thomas Windsor, Jack Edwin Byrd, Sr., Charles W. Wallace, and Malcolm Self (1937-2015). Wayne Reeves was called from Antioch as a pastor in Many, Louisiana.

Millard Perkins was a graduate of East Texas Baptist University in Marshall, Texas, and New Orleans Baptist Theological Seminary and had been the pastor of several congregations in Texas and Louisiana, including the Gilgal Baptist Church, originally established in 1842 and based in a 1947 sanctuary located on the Old Arcadia Road near Minden. Prior to his death of a heart attack, he  operated Perkins Grill in downtown Minden. He was survived by his wife, the former Pearl Buxton, and five children. Perkins is interred at Memorial Park Cemetery in Monroe, Louisiana.

Geography

Dixie Inn is located at  (32.594552, -93.336707).

Demographics

As of the census of 2000, there were 352 people, 146 households, and 88 families residing in the village. The racial makeup of the village was 81.25% White, 16.76% African American, 1.14% Native American, 0.28% from other races, and 0.57% from two or more races. Hispanic or Latino of any race were 0.28% of the population.

There were 146 households, out of which 32.9% had children under the age of 18 living with them, 32.2% were married couples living together, 19.2% had a female householder with no husband present, and 39.7% were non-families. 32.2% of all households were made up of individuals, and 13.0% had someone living alone who was 65 years of age or older. The average household size was 2.41 and the average family size was 3.03.

In the village, the population was spread out, with 28.7% under the age of 18, 9.7% from 18 to 24, 31.8% from 25 to 44, 18.2% from 45 to 64, and 11.6% who were 65 years of age or older. The median age was 32 years. For every 100 females, there were 90.3 males. For every 100 females age 18 and over, there were 88.7 males.

The median income for a household in the village was $21,500, and the median income for a family was $19,750. Males had a median income of $28,000 versus $20,500 for females. The per capita income for the village was $12,303. About 27.2% of families and 29.1% of the population were below the poverty line, including 40.5% of those under age 18 and 13.3% of those age 65 or over.

References

Villages in Louisiana
Villages in Webster Parish, Louisiana